Neovascularization is the natural formation of new blood vessels (neo- + vascular + -ization), usually in the form of functional microvascular networks, capable of perfusion by red blood cells, that form to serve as collateral circulation in response to local poor perfusion or ischemia.

Growth factors that inhibit neovascularization include those that affect endothelial cell division and differentiation. These growth factors often act in a paracrine or autocrine fashion; they include fibroblast growth factor, placental growth factor, insulin-like growth factor, hepatocyte growth factor, and platelet-derived endothelial growth factor.

There are three different pathways that comprise neovascularization:(1) vasculogenesis,(2) angiogenesis, and (3) arteriogenesis.

Three pathways of neovascularization

Vasculogenesis

Vasculogenesis is the de novo formation of blood vessels. This primarily occurs in the developing embryo with the development of the first primitive vascular plexus, but also occurs to a limited extent with post-natal vascularization. Embryonic vasculogenesis occurs when endothelial cells precursors (hemangioblasts) begin to proliferate and migrate into avascular areas. There, they aggregate to form the primitive network of vessels characteristic of embryos. This primitive vascular system is necessary to provide adequate blood flow to cells, supplying oxygen and nutrients, and removing metabolic wastes.

Angiogenesis

Angiogenesis is the most common type of neovascularization seen in development and growth, and is important to both physiological and pathological processes. Angiogenesis occurs through the formation of new vessels from pre-existing vessels. This occurs through the sprouting of new capillaries from post-capillary venules, requiring precise coordination of multiple steps and the participation and communication of multiple cell types. The complex process is initiated in response to local tissue ischemia or hypoxia, leading to the release of angiogenic factors such as VEGF and HIF-1. This leads to vasodilatation and an increase in vascular permeability, leading to sprouting angiogenesis or intussusceptive angiogenesis.

Arteriogenesis

Arteriogenesis is the process of flow-related remodelling of existing vasculature to create collateral arteries. This can occur in response to ischemic vascular diseases or increase demand (e.g. exercise training). Arteriogenesis is triggered through nonspecific factors, such as shear stress and blood flow.

Ocular pathologies

Corneal neovascularization

Corneal neovascularization is a condition where new blood vessels invade into the cornea from the limbus. It is triggered when the balance between angiogenic and antiangiogenic factors are disrupted that otherwise maintain corneal transparency. The immature new blood vessels can lead to persistent inflammation and scaring, lipid exudation into the corneal tissues, and a reduction in corneal transparency, which can affect visual acuity.

Retinopathy of prematurity

Retinopathy of prematurity is a condition that occurs in premature babies. In premature babies, the retina has not completely vascularized. Rather than continuing in the normal in utero fashion, the vascularization of the retina is disrupted, leading to an abnormal proliferation of blood vessels between the areas of vascularized and avascular retina. These blood vessels grow in abnormal ways and can invade into the vitreous humor, where they can hemorrhage or cause retinal detachment in neonates.

Diabetic retinopathy

Diabetic retinopathy, which can develop into proliferative diabetic retinopathy, is a condition where capillaries in the retina become occluded, which creates areas of ischemic retina and triggering the release of angiogenic growth factors. This retinal ischemia stimulates the proliferation of new blood vessels from pre-existing retinal venules. It is the leading cause of blindness of working age adults.

Age-related macular degeneration

In persons who are over 65 years old, age-related macular degeneration is the leading cause of severe vision loss. A subtype of age-related macular degeneration, wet macular degeneration, is characterized by the formation of new blood vessels that originate in the choroidal vasculature and extend into the subretinal space.

Choroidal neovascularization

In ophthalmology, choroidal neovascularization is the formation of a microvasculature within the innermost layer of the choroid of the eye. Neovascularization in the eye can cause a type of glaucoma (neovascularization glaucoma) if the new blood vessels' bulk blocks the constant outflow of aqueous humour from inside the eye.

Neovascularization and therapy

Ischemic heart disease

Cardiovascular disease is the leading cause of death in the world. Ischemic heart disease develops when stenosis and occlusion of coronary arteries develops, leading to reduced perfusion of the cardiac tissues. There is ongoing research exploring techniques that might be able to induce healthy neovascularization of ischemic cardiac tissues.

See also
Choroidal neovascularization
Corneal neovascularization
Revascularization
Rubeosis iridis
Inosculation

References

Angiology
Medical terminology